Trygve Simonsen (3 September 1937 – 18 April 2011) was a Norwegian politician for the Progress Party.

Career 
He served as a deputy representative to the Parliament of Norway from Troms during the term 1989–1993. In total he met during 55 days of parliamentary session. He was a member of Harstad city council following the 1987 Norwegian local elections, and was a member of Troms county council at the time of his death in 2011. In his working career, he was an engineer, and among others helped build the Tjeldsund Bridge.

References

1937 births
2011 deaths
People from Harstad
Progress Party (Norway) politicians
Deputy members of the Storting
Troms politicians
Norwegian engineers